The Southern Morning Herald was an English language newspaper published in Goulburn, New South Wales.  It was first published in 1868 before the federation of Australia and later absorbed the Goulburn Herald, a contemporary competitor for many years.

History
The newspaper was first published in 1868 by Frank Hartley and was later absorbed into the Goulburn Evening Penny Post.

Digitisation
The paper  has been digitised as part of the Australian Newspapers Digitisation Program  project of the National Library of Australia in cooperation with the State Library of New South Wales.

See also
 List of newspapers in Australia

References

Further reading
 Holden, W Sprague 1961, Australia goes to press, Melbourne University Press, Melbourne.
 Mayer, Henry 1964, The press in Australia, Lansdowne Press, Melbourne.
 Walker, R B 1976, The newspaper press in New South Wales 1803-1920, Sydney University Press, Sydney.

External links
 

Defunct newspapers published in New South Wales
Newspapers on Trove